The 2000 Michigan State Spartans football team represented Michigan State University in the 2000 NCAA Division I-A football season.  The Spartans played their home games at Spartan Stadium in East Lansing, Michigan. This was the first year for head coach Bobby Williams, who took over the program after previous head coach Nick Saban had left to take the head coaching position at Louisiana State University.

Schedule

Roster

Coaching Staff
Bobby Williams – Head Coach
Morris Watts – Offensive coordinator
Reggie Mitchell – Running backs coach
Don Treadwell – Wide receivers
Jeff Stoutland – Offensive Line coach
Bill Miller – Defensive coordinator
Bill Sheridan – Linebackers coach
Mark Dantonio – Defensive back coach
Brad Lawing – Assistant
Pat Perles – Assistant

Rankings

2001 NFL Draft
The following players were selected in the 2001 NFL Draft.

References

Michigan State
Michigan State Spartans football seasons
Michigan State Spartans football